Children in Need 2016 is a campaign held in the United Kingdom to raise money for the charity Children in Need. It was the 37th Children in Need appeal show which was broadcast live on BBC One on the evening of Friday 18 November until the early hours of Saturday 19 November. It was the first edition of the televised campaign since original presenter Terry Wogan's death in January 2016.

Dermot O'Leary, Fearne Cotton and Nick Grimshaw did not return for the 2016 telethon, and were replaced by Graham Norton, Ade Adepitan and Marvin Humes. Craig David performed the official Children in Need single for 2016, All We Needed.

Telethon
The culmination of Children in Need 2016 was broadcast on BBC One on 18 November from the BBC Elstree Centre.

This year saw the biggest totaliser record in the history of Children in Need, £46.6 million. It was announced in summer 2017 that the charity raised the highest ever fundraising total of £60,000,000.

Presenters

The presenters were:

Music

Features
 Fantastic Beasts Children In Need Special - with Eddie Redmayne
 Would I Lie To You? Children In Need Special
Cast of EastEnders go 80's
 Team GB does Strictly Come Dancing

Totals
The following are totals with the times they were announced on the televised show.

See also
 Children In Need

References

External links
 

2016 in British television
2016 in the United Kingdom
2016
November 2016 events in the United Kingdom